Trace formula may refer to:
Arthur–Selberg trace formula, also known as invariant trace formula, Jacquet's relative trace formula, simple trace formula, stable trace formula
Grothendieck trace formula
 Gutzwiller trace formula: See Quantum chaos
Kuznetsov trace formula
Local trace formula
Petersson trace formula
Selberg trace formula
Behrend's trace formula